Giovanni Boccardi may refer to:
 Giovanni Boccardi (painter)
 Giovanni Boccardi (astronomer)